William James McWilliams (12 October 1856 – 22 October 1929) was an Australian politician who served as the inaugural leader of the Country Party, in office from 1920 to 1921. He was a member of the House of Representatives from 1903 to 1922 and from 1928 to his death, on both occasions representing the Division of Franklin in Tasmania. He represented five different political parties during his time in parliament, eventually seeing out his final term as an independent.

Early life
Born in Bream Creek, near Sorell, Tasmania, the son of Irish immigrants who ran the local school. Originally trained as a teacher, McWilliams became a journalist in 1877, rising to editor of the Launceston Telegraph in 1883. Marrying Josephine Fullerton in Melbourne on 19 October 1893, McWilliams's role as editor helped his stature in the local community enough to ensure his election to the Tasmanian House of Assembly for the electorate of Ringarooma in the 1893 election.

An Australian rules football fan, in 1897 McWilliams help found the Southern Tasmania Football Association and remained a senior figure in football administration in Tasmania.

McWilliams bought the Hobart-based Tasmanian News in 1896 and moved to Hobart shortly after, unsuccessfully standing for the seat of Glenorchy in 1900.

Politics
Switching to federal politics, McWilliams won the Franklin at the 1903 election as a Revenue Tariffist supporting the Free Trade Party on most economic issues.

In parliament, McWilliams advocated strongly on behalf of farmers, investigated the possibility of introducing sugarbeet farming into Tasmania and helped found the Tasmanian meteorological bureau. He also supported giving women and ex-convicts the vote but opposed Federation, believing it should be delayed.

In parliament, McWilliams, like almost all his fellow members, strongly supported the White Australia Policy, but opposed federal spending on issues such as the establishment of the High Court of Australia, a federal department of agriculture, a transcontinental railway and federal acquisition of the Northern Territory. As in state parliament, McWilliams was a staunch advocate on rural matters, supporting the timber industry and primary producers.

Leader of the Country Party

After assisting in the formation of the Country Party in 1920, McWilliams was appointed as its first federal parliamentary leader. However McWilliams did not always see eye to eye with his party colleagues and at times voted against the wishes of the party. He was relieved of the leadership of the Country Party in April 1921 and lost his seat at the 1922 election.

Later years
McWilliams left the Country Party after losing the leadership, and unsuccessfully contested Franklin at the 1925 election as a Nationalist.

Running as an independent, he regained Franklin in 1928 and was again successful in 1929, although there was little time for celebration following his second win, because McWilliams died in Hobart from angina pectoris within hours of the declaration of the poll. He was survived by his wife, two daughters and a son.

References 

Free Trade Party members of the Parliament of Australia
Commonwealth Liberal Party members of the Parliament of Australia
Nationalist Party of Australia members of the Parliament of Australia
National Party of Australia members of the Parliament of Australia
Independent members of the Parliament of Australia
Australian monarchists
1856 births
1929 deaths
Members of the Australian House of Representatives for Franklin
Members of the Australian House of Representatives
Revenue Tariff Party members of the Parliament of Australia
Leaders of the National Party of Australia
20th-century Australian politicians